Camrose is a provincial electoral district in Alberta, Canada. The district is one of 87 districts mandated to return a single member (MLA) to the Legislative Assembly of Alberta using the first past the post method of voting. The district was originally created in 1909 and dissolved in 1993, and recreated for the 2019 Alberta general election.

The Camrose electoral district is represented by Jackie Lovely of the United Conservative Party of Alberta.

Geography
The district is named for its main population centre, Camrose. Its boundaries have been adjusted many times since its creation in 1909, when it was carved from the eastern parts of Wetaskiwin and Ponoka. Between 1993 and 2019, the city of Camrose was transferred to the new district of Wetaskiwin-Camrose, and the surrounding areas were transferred to several neighbouring districts.

The new incarnation of the district, re-created in the 2017 redistribution, includes most of Camrose County, all of Flagstaff County, and all of Beaver County. Over two-fifths of the district's population lives in the City of Camrose. It includes the communities of Camrose, Bawlf, New Norway, Bashaw, Daysland, Rosalind, Ferintosh, Tofield, Round Hill, Kingman, and Ohaton.

Representation history

1909–1993

The new district was picked up by the governing Liberals in 1909, with George P. Smith serving as MLA for three terms. In his final term, he was appointed Minister of Education.

In 1921, the United Farmers of Alberta swept most of rural Alberta from the Liberals, and Smith was soundly defeated by Vernor Smith (of no relation). He was appointed Minister of Railways and Telephones in the new government. Easily re-elected for two more terms, Smith stayed on as Minister until his sudden death in 1932. The resulting by-election delivered future Co-operative Commonwealth Federation leader Chester Ronning to the Legislature, although at the time he was still a member of the United Farmers.

The 1935 election again saw the government swept from power, and Ronning was defeated by Social Credit candidate William Chant. In the tumultuous early years of William Aberhart's government, Chant was appointed Minister of Agriculture but resigned as Minister and left the party in 1937. He did not run for re-election in 1940.

Social Credit MLA for Edmonton (and Chant's replacement as Agriculture Minister) David B. Mullen decided to run in Camrose in 1940, recapturing the district in a razor-thin contest against Chester Ronning, now running as a CCF candidate. Mullen died suddenly the same year.

Ronning ran again in the resulting by-election, but the district was held by Social Credit once again with Chester Sayers becoming MLA. He would become the district's longest-serving representative, winning re-election seven times (although remaining a backbencher throughout his career). He retired from politics at the Legislature's dissolution after his eighth term.

Camrose would again vote with a change in government in 1971, sending Progressive Conservative candidate Gordon Stromberg to the Legislature. He served four terms as MLA, also remaining a backbencher.

The district's final representative was PC Ken Rostad. He soundly defeated Western Canada Concept leader Jack Ramsay to enter the Legislature in 1986, and was appointed Solicitor General by premier Don Getty. He was re-elected in 1989 but was shuffled out of cabinet by new premier Ralph Klein in 1992. Camrose was abolished in 1993, and Rostad went on to become MLA for Wetaskiwin-Camrose.

Current district
The district was re-created by the Electoral Boundaries Commission in 2017 and was contested in the 2019 Alberta general election. United Conservative Party candidate Jackie Lovely, a self-employed saleswoman defeated the six other candidates capturing 15,587 votes, 65 per cent of electors. Her nearest competitor New Democratic Party candidate Morgan Bamford, a municipal-indigenous relations consultant, captured 4,387 votes, good for 18 per cent of the vote.

Election results

1909

|}

1910s

|}

|}

|}

1920s

1930s

|}

|}

1940s

|-
!colspan=6|Second count

|-
|bgcolor=black|
|colspan=2|Exhausted ballots
|align=right|416

|}

|}

|}

		
				

					

|}

1950s

		
				

					

|}

|-
!colspan=6|Final count

|-
|bgcolor=black|
|colspan=2|Exhausted ballots
|align=right|225
		
				

					

|}

		
				

					

|}

1960s

		
				

					

|}

		
				

					

|}

1970s

		
				

					

|}

		
				

					

|}

		
				

					

|}

1980s

		
				

					

|}

		
				

					

|}

		
				

					

|}

2010s

Plebiscite results

1957 liquor plebiscite

On October 30, 1957 a stand-alone plebiscite was held province wide in all 50 of the then current provincial electoral districts in Alberta. The government decided to consult Alberta voters to decide on liquor sales and mixed drinking after a divisive debate in the Legislature. The plebiscite was intended to deal with the growing demand for reforming antiquated liquor control laws.

The plebiscite was conducted in two parts. Question A, asked in all districts, asked the voters if the sale of liquor should be expanded in Alberta, while Question B, asked in a handful of districts within the corporate limits of Calgary and Edmonton, asked if men and women were allowed to drink together in establishments.

Province wide Question A of the plebiscite passed in 33 of the 50 districts while Question B passed in all five districts. Camrose voted heavily against it. The district recorded the second best turnout in the province. It was well above the province wide average of 46%.

Official district returns were released to the public on December 31, 1957. The Social Credit government in power at the time did not consider the results binding. However the results of the vote led the government to repeal all existing liquor legislation and introduce an entirely new Liquor Act.

Municipal districts lying inside electoral districts that voted against the plebiscite such as Camrose were designated Local Option Zones by the Alberta Liquor Control Board and considered effective dry zones, business owners who wanted a license had to petition for a binding municipal plebiscite in order to be granted a license.

See also
List of Alberta provincial electoral districts
Camrose, Alberta, a city in central Alberta

References

Further reading

External links
Elections Alberta
The Legislative Assembly of Alberta

Alberta provincial electoral districts
Camrose, Alberta